WUBN-LP (106.9 FM, "The Spirit") is a radio station broadcasting an Urban Gospel format. Licensed to Wilson, North Carolina, United States, the station is currently owned by Miracle Christian International Life Center.

References

External links
 

UBN-LP
UBN-LP
Wilson, North Carolina
Radio stations established in 2002
Gospel radio stations in the United States
2002 establishments in North Carolina